Llandegfan (meaning The Church of St Tegfan) is a village on the east of island of Anglesey in Wales. It is part of the community of Cwm Cadnant. Population is around 1,580.

History and description
The original village, Hen Llandegfan or Hen Landegfan, was on the ancient way from the crossing of the Menai Strait at Menai Bridge via Pentraeth to Beaumaris. St Tegfan's Church, the mother church of Beaumaris, has been greatly restored.

Llandegfan has expanded greatly in recent decades and is continuing to expand in the 21st century, notably in the extension to the Mill Lodge estate and along Lon Ganol. Almost all of this expansion is centred on the modern village centre to the south and east of the old windmill. The village is expanding for various reasons, including its proximity to Bangor, where many of the residents of Llandegfan work, and to the A55, and the views from the village over to the mountains of Snowdonia.

After the death of the last family owner, the building was derelict for many years, before being converted into a nursing home. Financial constraints meant much of the original land was sold, and in the latter years the home struggled to stay open. In July 2011 it was announced that the home was to close and the building redeveloped into luxury flats and apartments. Despite its modern history, the external features of the building have changed little but many of the internal features have been lost.

Llandegfan had a senior football team playing in the Anglesey League called Llandegfan Antelope FC, who played their home matches at Cae Llandegfan. As of 2021 Llandegfan F.C. represent the village and are in the North Wales Coast West Football League Division One.

A rare European White Elm Ulmus laevis grows near the village.

The village is in two parts: the original village, now called Hen Llandegfan, around the chapel (Capel Barachia). The other, much larger, part grew to the south of the old village and next to the A545. In 2003 a new estate, Gwel y Llan, was built in the village; this is the most recent development there. There is a primary school with over 120 children. The population of the village in 2010 was 927.

The parish hall in the village is used for meetings, charity events, and the youth club. Outside is a play park.

The Pen y Cefn pub is near the old mill.

Notable people
Robert ap Huw (ca.1580 – 1665), a Welsh harpist, music copyist and became a gentleman farmer here
 Louise Elliott (born 1969), broadcaster and journalist, brought up in Llandegfan
 Aled Jones (born 1970), singer and radio and TV presenter; lived in Llandegfan as a child
 Rhun ap Iorwerth (born 1972), journalist and politician; lived in Llandegfan as a child

Notes

Bibliography

External links 
 photos of Llandegfan and surrounding area on geograph
 A Vision of Britain Through Time: Llandegfan
 Genuki: Llandegfan

Villages in Anglesey
Cwm Cadnant